Mike Barnes (born December 24, 1950 in Pittsburgh) is a former American football player.  He played defensive tackle for the Baltimore Colts from 1973 through 1981. He was selected to the Pro Bowl after the 1977 season.  Before turning pro, Barnes attended the Pittsburgh public school Peabody High School and the University of Miami.

References

1950 births
Living people
Players of American football from Pittsburgh
American football defensive linemen
Miami Hurricanes football players
Baltimore Colts players
American Conference Pro Bowl players